Sidi Slimane Province is a province of Morocco in the Rabat-Salé-Kénitra economic region. The province was created in 2009 by Decree number 2-09-319, out of the southwestern part of Kénitra Province. The province has two major urban areas: Sidi Slimane and Sidi Yahya. Sidi Slimane is the administrative headquarters.

Geography
Sidi Slimane Province lies in northern Morocco and has no coastline. It is bordered:

to the north and east by Sidi Kacem Province of Rabat-Salé-Kénitra; 
to the southeast by Meknès Prefecture of the Fès-Meknès region; 
to the south by Khémisset Province of Rabat-Salé-Kénitra; 
to the west by Kénitra Province of Rabat-Salé-Kénitra.

Subdivisions
Sidi Slimane Province is divided into two municipalities, Sidi Slimane and Sidi Yahya, and nine rural communities. The nine rural communities are organized into four chieftaincies:
 Boumaiz Chieftaincy with Boumaiz (بومعيز) and Awlad Ben Hammadi (اولاد بن حمادي)
 Dar Bel Amri Chieftaincy with Dar Bel Amri (دار بلعامري) and Azghar (أزغار)
 Kceibya Chieftaincy with Kceibya (القصيبية) and Sfafaa (السفافعة)
 M’saada Chieftaincy with M’saada (لمساعدة) and Awlad Ahcene (اولاد احسين)

References

 
Sidi Slimane Province